Doyle  Middleton (born 11 April 1994) is a footballer. He is a midfielder and a free-agent.

Career
He made his debut for Preston North End on 7 August 2010 in the Football League Cup clash with Stockport County at Edgeley Park, which Preston won 5–0. Middleton came on as a second-half substitute for Paul Hayes. On 30 April 2011 Middleton made his league debut coming on as a second-half substitute against Ipswich Town. Middleton made his first start for PNE against Exeter on 20 August 2011.

Career statistics

Statistics accurate as of match played 28 August 2010

References

External links

1994 births
Living people
Footballers from Southport
English footballers
Association football midfielders
Preston North End F.C. players
Kendal Town F.C. players
Northwich Victoria F.C. players
English Football League players